The Sierra de Grazalema Natural Park is a natural park in the northeastern part of the province of Cádiz in southern Spain. The park encompasses, within its , a complex of mountain ranges, known collectively as the Sierra de Grazalema, which, in turn, are part of the Cordillera Subbética. Other ranges within the park, comprising the Sierra de Grazalema, include the Sierra de Zafalgar, the Sierra del Pinar, and the Sierra de Endrinal. Pinar (or Torreón),  in elevation, is the tallest peak.

The Sierra de Grazalema, a karstic region, contains a number of large limestone caverns, including the Cueva del Gato, the Cueva de la Pileta and the Garganta Verde.
The Sierra de Grazalema is also home to many colonies of vultures, including a few pairs of Egyptian vultures, a species which is seriously threatened.  The natural park was declared a biosphere reserve in 1977.

Towns and cities within the park
All or part of nine municipalities of the province of Cádiz lie within the Natural Park of Grazalema: Algodonales, Benaocaz, El Bosque, El Gastor, Grazalema, Prado del Rey, Ubrique, Villaluenga del Rosario, and Zahara de la Sierra. Likewise, there are five towns in Málaga province that have land within park boundaries: Benaoján, Cortes de la Frontera, Jimera de Líbar, Montejaque, and Ronda.

Gallery

See also
List of Sites of Community Importance in Andalusia

External links

[https://grazalemaguide.com/blog/the-sierra-de-grazalema-natural-park/ Grazalema Natural Park - Tourist Information

Natural parks of Spain
Natural parks of Andalusia
Geography of the Province of Cádiz
Geography of the Province of Málaga
Biosphere reserves of Spain
Protected areas established in 1977